Peripatus dominicae is a species of velvet worm in the Peripatidae family. Males of this species have 25 pairs of legs; females can have 28 to 31 pairs of legs, but usually have 29. Females in this species range in size from 29 mm to 56 mm in length, while males range from 17 mm to 25 mm in length. The original description of preserved specimens report that this species is usually reddish brown with a diffuse darker streak down the middle of the back, with a much paler "light grey or greyish yellow" ventral surface. Like other neotropical peripatid velvet worms, this species is viviparous, with mothers supplying nourishment to their embryos through a placenta. The type locality is in Dominica.

References

Onychophorans of tropical America
Onychophoran species
Animals described in 1894